Orange City Municipal Airport  was a city-owned public-use airport located one nautical mile (1.85 km) south of the central business district of Orange City, a city in Sioux County, Iowa, United States. This airport was included in the FAA's National Plan of Integrated Airport Systems for 2009–2013, which categorized it as a general aviation facility.

Although many U.S. airports use the same three-letter location identifier for the FAA and IATA, this facility was assigned ORC by the FAA but had no designation from the IATA (which assigned ORC to Orocue Airport in Orocue, Colombia).

Facilities and aircraft 
It had one runway designated 16/34 with a 4,250 by 60 feet (1,295 x 18 m) concrete surface. For the 12-month period ending August 19, 2009, the airport had 4,200 general aviation aircraft operations, an average of 81 per week: 43% local and 57% itinerant. At that time there were 11 aircraft based at this airport: 10 single-engine and 1 multi-engine.

References

External links 
 

Defunct airports in the United States
Airports in Iowa
Transportation buildings and structures in Sioux County, Iowa